Claudiu Iulian Niculescu (born 23 June 1976) is a Romanian football coach and former striker. He is currently the manager of Liga II side CSC 1599 Șelimbăr.

Club career

Claudiu Niculescu was born in Slatina and started playing football at the youth club CSȘ Slatina, alongside Ionel Dănciulescu, Ionuț Luțu and Augustin Chiriță, being coached by Ion Pârvulescu. He started his senior career playing at Jiul IELIF Craiova in Divizia B, after which he played for one season for Drobeta-Turnu Severin in Divizia C, returning for the following one season and a half to play in Divizia B at Electroputere Craiova. Niculescu made his Divizia A debut on 1 March 1998, playing for Universitatea Craiova under Spanish coach José Ramón Alexanko in a 2–1 victory against Petrolul Ploiești in which he scored one goal. He spent three years and a half at Universitatea Craiova, scoring 41 goals in 93 Divizia A matches, appearing in two games without scoring in the 2000–01 UEFA Cup and also reaching two Cupa României finals. In his first season with Dinamo Bucharest, he won the Divizia A title and was the second top-goalscorer of the league with 15 goals. In 2002 Niculescu was transferred to Genoa in Serie B. After a half of season, Niculescu returned to Dinamo Bucharest, winning the championship title in the 2003–04 season, contributing with 16 goals scored in 28 matches. In the 2004–05 season he scored 21 goals, sharing with Gheorghe Bucur the top goalscorer of Divizia A title, forming a couple in Dinamo's offence with Ionel Dănciulescu, the Romanian press calling them the "N&D couple", a nickname inspired from the first letters of their family name and the Romanian pop band "N&D". In the 2006–07 season, Niculescu won another championship title with Dinamo and became the top scorer of the league with 18 goals, four of these were scored in a 4–1 against rivals Rapid Bucharest and two in a 4–2 victory in a derby against Steaua Bucharest. He was the second best goal-scorer in the 2006–07 UEFA Cup with eight goals, three less than Espanyol's Walter Pandiani, helping The Red Dogs reach the sixteenths-finals where they were eliminated by Benfica. He played 43 matches and scored 18 goals for Dinamo in European matches, being the player with the most matches played and top scorer in European competitions for the club. In January 2008, Niculescu was transferred by Dinamo at MSV Duisburg for 700.000€, where he was teammate with fellow Romanians Mihai Tararache and Iulian Filipescu, playing 15 Bundesliga matches in which he scored 4 goals, but at the end of the season he was transferred in Cyprus at Omonia. In 2009 he returned for a third spell at Dinamo which lasted one year and a half, after which he went to play for two seasons at Universitatea Cluj where he ended his playing career. Niculescu was a striker skilled in free kicks, being nicknamed "Lunetistul" (The Sniper) by the Romanian press. Claudiu Niculescu is 11th in an all-time ranking for the goalscorers in Liga I, with 156 goals scored in 326 matches played.

International career
Claudiu Niculescu played 8 games at international level for Romania, making his debut when coach László Bölöni sent him on the field in order to replace Marius Niculae in the 81st minute of a friendly which ended with a 2–1 victory against FR Yugoslavia. He also played two games at the 2006 World Cup qualifiers and one at the Euro 2008 qualifiers.

Career statistics

International

Coaching career
His first experience as a coach was in November 2010 for two matches at Universitatea Cluj, where he was at the same time an active player. His second experience as a coach started in March 2012 which was also at Universitatea Cluj and also being in the same time an active player. In 15 games under his command, the club won four games, draw in six and lost five. Niculescu resigned after the first game of the 2012–13 season, a loss at Pandurii Târgu Jiu: 6–2.

On 25 September 2012, Niculescu was installed as the head coach of Liga II team Bihor Oradea with an objective to help the team promote to the first division. In December, Niculescu ended his contract, after only eight games (two wins, three draws and three losses).

In January 2013, Niculescu took over Damila Măciuca, in Liga II.

September 2018, Niculescu was appointed coach of Dinamo București, following the dismissal of Florin Bratu. He signed a contract until 2020.

On 7 January 2021, Niculescu signed a contract with Liga II side Concordia Chiajna.

Managerial statistics 
Updated as of 7 May 2021

Personal life
Claudiu Niculescu's brothers Mihai and Dragoș and his cousin Ovidiu were footballers in the Romanian lower leagues. His father Marin was a football coach in the Romanian lower leagues. In 1998 he married Lidia and they had together two kids, Alexandru and Rebecca. They divorced in 2006. In June 2007, he married Diana Munteanu who was a TV host, their wedding was considered the wedding of the year by the Romanian press. Together they had a son named David Cristian. Claudiu and Diana divorced in 2014.

Honours

Player
Universitatea Craiova
Cupa României runner-up: 1997–98, 1999–2000
Dinamo București
Divizia A: 2001–02, 2003–04, 2006–07
Cupa României: 2002–03, 2003–04, 2004–05
Supercupa României: 2005

Individual
Liga 1 Golden Boot: 2004–05, 2006–07

Manager
Voluntari
Cupa României: 2016–17
Supercupa României: 2017

References

External links

1976 births
Living people
Sportspeople from Slatina, Romania
Romanian footballers
Association football forwards
FC Drobeta-Turnu Severin players
FC U Craiova 1948 players
FC Dinamo București players
MSV Duisburg players
Genoa C.F.C. players
AC Omonia players
FC Universitatea Cluj players
Liga I players
Liga II players
Liga III players
Bundesliga players
Serie B players
Cypriot First Division players
Romanian expatriate footballers
Expatriate footballers in Italy
Expatriate footballers in Germany
Expatriate footballers in Cyprus
Romanian expatriate sportspeople in Cyprus
Romanian expatriate sportspeople in Saudi Arabia
Romania international footballers
Romanian football managers
FC Universitatea Cluj managers
FC Bihor Oradea managers
CS Sportul Snagov managers
CS Mioveni managers
FC Voluntari managers
FC Dinamo București managers
Al-Ta'ee managers
CS Concordia Chiajna managers
FC Politehnica Iași (2010) managers
CSC 1599 Șelimbăr managers
Saudi First Division League managers
Expatriate football managers in Saudi Arabia